Escape Island Lighthouse is a heritage listed  lighthouse which was constructed in the centre of Escape Island, on the coast of Western Australia in 1930.

The light was a group flashing white light model, showing three flashes every fifteen seconds. Originally powered by butane gas, it was converted to solar power in 1986; it now consists of a solar powered unmanned light on top of a steel tower.

See also
 List of lighthouses in Australia

References

Lighthouses in Western Australia